The Papal Jurisdiction Act 1560 (c.2) is an Act of the Parliament of Scotland which is still in force. It declares that the Pope has no jurisdiction in Scotland and prohibits any person from seeking any title or right to be exercised in Scotland granted under the authority of the Pope, on pain of proscription, banishment and disqualification from holding any public office or honour.

Extract

Usage
The Scottish Catholic hierarchy was restored by Pope Leo XIII in 1878 without legal reaction and remains in place today.

See also
Judiciary of Scotland
Scots law
Temporal jurisdiction (papacy)

References

External links

16th century in international relations
1560 in law
1560 in Christianity
1560 in Scotland
Acts of the Parliament of Scotland
Anti-Catholicism in Scotland
Catholicism and politics
Christianity and law in the 16th century
Conflict of laws
Constitutional laws of Scotland
Foreign relations of Scotland
History of Catholicism in Scotland
History of the Church of Scotland
International law
Judiciary of Scotland
Scottish Reformation

Church of Scotland